Beinn Mhic-Mhonaidh (796 m) is a mountain in the Grampian Mountains of Scotland, west of Glen Orchy in Argyll and Bute.

Climbs usually start from the
Eas Urchaidh waterfall in Glen Orchy. The peak has forested lower slopes and provides superb views from its summit.

References

Mountains and hills of Argyll and Bute
Marilyns of Scotland
Corbetts